Roslund is a surname. Notable people with the surname include:

Anders Roslund (born 1961), Swedish writer
Carl-Axel Roslund (born 1948), Swedish politician
Ivar Roslund (1907–1988), Swedish footballer
Lennart Roslund (born 1946), Swedish sailor

Surnames of Swedish origin